Mohamed Sofiane Belrekaa (born 21 March 1991) is an Algerian judoka. He represented Algeria at the 2019 African Games held in Rabat, Morocco and he won the silver medal in the men's +100 kg event.

At the 2021 African Judo Championships held in Dakar, Senegal, he won the silver medal in his event.

He won the silver medal in the men's +100 kg event at the 2022 Mediterranean Games held in Oran, Algeria.

References

External links 
 

Living people
1991 births
Place of birth missing (living people)
Algerian male judoka
African Games medalists in judo
African Games silver medalists for Algeria
Competitors at the 2019 African Games
Competitors at the 2022 Mediterranean Games
Mediterranean Games silver medalists for Algeria
Mediterranean Games medalists in judo
21st-century Algerian people